Clarke County may refer to:

Places
One of five counties in the United States:
Clarke County, Alabama
Clarke County, Georgia
Clarke County, Iowa
Clarke County, Mississippi
Clarke County, Virginia
Clarke County, New South Wales, in Australia

Clarke County was also the official name of Clark County, Washington  from 1849 until 1925, when the spelling was changed.

Ships
USS Clarke County (LST-601), a United States Navy tank landing ship in commission as USS LST-601 from 1944 to 1955 and as USS Clarke County in 1955 and during the late 1960s

See also
Clark County (disambiguation)